Deep network may refer to
 Deep belief network
 Deep neural network